Audentes Sports Gymnasium is a sports school in Tallinn, and with the branch in Otepää, Estonia.

School's history goes back to 1 September 1967 when Tallinn Sports Boarding School was established in Tallinn. In 1990, the school was re-organized, when Tallinn Sports College and another sports school was merged. New name for the three merged schools became Estonian Sports Gymnasium.

In 2000, Estonian Sports Gymnasium was acquired by AS Audentes. School was re-organized into Audentes Sports Gymnasium.

Notable alumni

 Tiit Sokk, basketball player, Olympic winner
 Viljar Loor, volleyball player, Olympic winner
 Allar Levandi, nordic combined skier, Olympic medallist

References

External links
 

Schools in Tallinn
Otepää Parish
Sports culture in Estonia
Sports schools